Hopetoun Railway Station was a railway station on the Patchewollock railway line. It was opened in April 1894 and closed to passengers in 1976 with the cessation of the railmotor service from Murtoa railway station. By 1956, the telegraph equipment was removed, by 1970, the turntable was removed and by 1977, the Station master was removed. The station building has since been removed, and only the Grain silos/goods shed remains.

References 

Disused railway stations in Victoria (Australia)